The A 24 road is an A-Grade trunk road in Sri Lanka. It connects Matara with Akuressa.

The A 24 passes through Thelijavila to reach Akuressa.

References

Highways in Sri Lanka